The second USS Union was a schooner that served in the United States Navy briefly during the Mexican War.

Union was serving as a Mexican schooner when the U.S. Navy steam screw corvette  captured her off Tampico, Mexico, on 14 November 1846. She entered U.S. Navy service later that month with Lieutenant John Ancrum Winslow in command.

Poorly equipped, Union was wrecked on a reef off Veracruz, Mexico, on 16 December 1846.

References

See also 
 John Ancrum Winslow
 Mexican–American War

Schooners of the United States Navy
Mexican–American War ships of the United States
Maritime incidents in December 1846
Shipwrecks in the Gulf of Mexico
Shipwrecks of the Mexican-American War
Shipwrecks of Mexico
1846 ships